Elections to Portsmouth City Council were held on 10 June 2004.  One third of the council was up for election and the council stayed under no overall control. Overall turnout was 34.9%.

After the election, the composition of the council was:
Liberal Democrat 20
Conservative 15
Labour 7

Election result

Ward results

References
2004 Portsmouth election result
Full results
Ward turnouts 

2004
2004 English local elections
2000s in Hampshire